This is a list of Italian television related events from 2016.

Events
13 May - 26-year-old harmonica player Moses wins the seventh season of Italia's Got Talent.
23 May - Alice Paba wins the fourth season of The Voice of Italy.

Debuts

RAI

Serials 

 L’allieva (The pupil) – by various directors, with Alessandra Mastronardi and Lino Guanciale, from the Alessia Gazzola’s novels; 3 seasons (till now). It's the most successful among the Italian forensic dramas and has for protagonist Alice Allievi, a young would-be coroner, professionally capable but maladroit in the private life.
 Medici, by various directors, with Richard Madden (Cosimo de' Medici), Daniel Sharman (Lorenzo il Magnifico) and Dustin Hoffman (Giovanni di Bicci de Medici); 3 seasons (till now); coproduction with Great Britain. The series, despite its great production values, gets mixed critics, moreover for the excessive historical inaccuracies. 
The mafia kills only in summer, by Luca Ribuoli, with Claudio Gioè, Licia Foglietta and Pif (as the teller), from the Pif's movie; 2 seasons. 
Thou shalt not kill, procedural set in Turin, with Miriam Leone and Monica Guerritore; 2 seasons. 
Rocco Schiavone – procedural set in Aosta, from the Antonio Manzini's novels, with Marco Giallini in the title role, an unruly and contemptuous but gifted deputy-commissioner, transferred from Rome as a punishment; 4 seasons (till now).

Television shows

RAI

Drama 

 Io non mi arrendo (I don't give up) – by Enzo Monteleone, with Beppe Fiorello; 2 episodes. A police inspector fights against both the traffic of toxic waste and a cancer gotten because his field investigations.
 Io sono Libero (I'm Libero, or I'm free) – docudrama by Francesco Micicchè, with Adriano Chiaramida as Libero Grassi.
 Luisa Spagnoli – biopic by Ludovico Gasparini, with Luisa Ranieri in the title role; 2 episodes.

Serials 

 Come fai sbagli (Everything you do, you wrong) – by Riccardo Donna and Tiziana Aristarco, remake of the French Fais pas ci, fais pas ça, with Daniele Pecci, Francesca Inaudi and Caterina Guzzanti; 12 episodes. Two couples of parents raise their sons with opposite methods (authoritarian and permissive), both with disappointing results.

News and educational 

 Alla scoperta dei musei vaticani (Discovering the Vatican Museums) – by Alberto Angela; 3 episodes.

2000s
Grande Fratello (2000–present)
Ballando con le stelle (2005–present)
X Factor (2008–present)

2010s
Italia's Got Talent (2010–present)
The Voice of Italy (2013–present)

Ending this year

Births

Deaths

See also
2016 in Italy
List of Italian films of 2016

References